John Armand Busterud (March 7, 1921 - January 4, 2016) was a Republican Assemblyman in the California legislature for the 22nd District. He was also Chair of the Council on Environmental Quality, was married to Anne Witwer and had three children: John, James and Mary.

Military service
After college, Busterund became an officer in the United States Army and served 90th Infantry Division in World War II. His unit seized art and gold hidden by Germany in a salt mine. He wrote the Below The Salt, an account of his units capture of the German gold reserves at Merkers Mine in the war. After the war, Busterund continued his service in the army and achieved the rank of lieutenant colonel.

References

1921 births
2016 deaths
United States Army personnel of World War II
Art and cultural repatriation after World War II
Republican Party members of the California State Assembly
United States Army officers
Writers from California